Atutur may refer to any of the following

 Atutur Town, a town in Kumi District, in the Eastern Region of Uganda
 Atutur sub-county, a sub-county in Kumi District, Uganda
 Atutur Parish, a parish in Atutur sub-county, Kumi District, Uganda
 Atutur Sub-County Sacco, a cooperative savings society in Atutur sub-county
 Atutur General Hospital, a 100-bed, government-owned hospital in Atutur sub-county.